Ivan Gakhov and Alexander Pavlioutchenkov were the defending champions but chose to participate with different partners. Gakhov partnered John Paul Fruttero but lost in the quarterfinals to Andrés Artuñedo and Emil Ruusuvuori. Pavlioutchenkov partnered Pavel Kotov but lost in the first round to Arjun Kadhe and Vijay Sundar Prashanth.

Evan King and Hunter Reese won the title after defeating Nikola Čačić and Yang Tsung-hua 6–3, 5–7, [10–4] in the final.

Seeds

Draw

References

External links
 Main draw

Fergana Challenger - Men's Doubles
2019 Men's Doubles